Abdul Majid Kalakani  (1939 – 8 June 1980) also known as Majid Agha was a political revolutionary, . He was  the founder and leader of the Liberation Organization of the People of Afghanistan (SAMA).

Biography
Majid Kalakani was born in 1939 in the village of Kalakan in Shomali Plain. In 1945 his father and grandfather were arrested and executed by the Mohammad Hashim Khan regime. Kalakani was a Maoist activist in the 1960s and a member of the movement Shalleh-ye Javiyd. In 1978, Kalakani founded SAMA. He was a leader of the Maoist resistance against the PDPA regime and Soviet invasion. In 1979 he founded the United National Front of Afghanistan. On 27 February 1980 Majid Kalakani was arrested near Kabul as the result of the 3 Hut uprising against Soviet occupation. He was executed on June 8, 1980.

References

Further reading
 Journal of the University of Baluchistan, 1981: Abd al-Majid Kalakani as the Symbol of National Resistance.

External links
 Afghanistan: Celebration on the anniversary of Majid Kalakani death

1939 births
1980 deaths
Afghan Tajik people
Afghan communists
Afghan revolutionaries
20th-century Afghan poets
Maoists
Maoism in Afghanistan
Executed Afghan people
Executed communists
Executed revolutionaries
Male poets
20th-century executions by Afghanistan